A paletot  is a type of topcoat. The name is French, but etymologically derived from the  Middle English word  paltok, meaning  a kind of jacket.

Historically, it was a semi-fitted to fitted coat, double-breasted or single-breasted, the front sometimes fastened by a fly, with or without pleats, and with or without pockets. A modern paletot is a classic business overcoat, usually double-breasted with a 6×2 button arrangement, the top buttons placed wider apart and not fastened, with peaked lapels, a flat back and no belt. A paletot is often made of flannel or tweed in charcoal or navy blue.

See also
Chesterfield coat
Covert coat
Polo coat
Duffel coat
Pea coat
Trench coat

References

French clothing
Coats (clothing)